Helen Gradwell Varcoe (18 February 1907 – 7 May 1995), later known by her married name Helen Nicholls, was an English competitive swimmer who represented Great Britain at the 1932 Summer Olympics in Los Angeles.  Varcoe won a bronze medal swimming the anchor leg for the British women's team in the 4×100-metre freestyle relay, together with her teammates Joyce Cooper, Valerie Davies and Edna Hughes.  The British women finished third with a time of 4:52.4, behind the Americans (4:38.0) and Dutch (4:47.5), and ahead of the Canadians (5:05.7).

Varcoe was born in Croydon, London, and died in Truro, Cornwall.

See also
 List of Olympic medalists in swimming (women)

References

External links
 

1907 births
1995 deaths
English female swimmers
English female freestyle swimmers
Olympic bronze medallists for Great Britain
Olympic bronze medalists in swimming
Olympic swimmers of Great Britain
Swimmers at the 1932 Summer Olympics
Medalists at the 1932 Summer Olympics